A treacle sponge pudding is a traditional British dessert dish consisting of a steamed sponge cake with treacle cooked on top of it, sometimes also poured over it and often served with hot custard.

The dish has been mass-produced and imported into the United States, and provided to consumers as a canned product that can be cooked in a microwave oven.

See also
 List of steamed foods

References

External links  
 Delia Smith Treacle sponge pudding recipe

British puddings
English cuisine
Custard desserts
Steamed foods